The 1984 United States presidential election in Alaska took place on November 6, 1984, as part of the nationwide presidential election. Voters chose three representatives, or electors to the Electoral College, who voted for president and vice president.

Alaska was won by incumbent President Ronald Reagan (R-California) with almost two-thirds of the popular vote against Walter Mondale (D-Minnesota) with 29.9%.  Reagan ultimately won the national vote, winning re-election. Alaska has only voted Democratic once, and that was in 1964 for Lyndon B. Johnson. Libertarian candidate David Bergland also had his best performance in this state, but did not receive nearly as much support as Ed Clark did in the previous election four years earlier. 

This was the first election since 1964 that a single third party failed to garner 5% of the vote, as had been done by George Wallace in 1968, John G. Schmitz in 1972,  Roger MacBride in 1976, and Ed Clark and John B. Anderson in 1980. This is the best Republican performance in a presidential election in the state's history.

Results

See also
United States presidential elections in Alaska

References

Alaska
1984
1984 Alaska elections